Warszawianka may refer to:

 Warszawianka (1831), Polish patriotic song originally written in French as La Varsovienne in 1831
 Whirlwinds of Danger or Warszawianka (1905), Polish revolutionary song originally written in Polish in 1879, popularized in Poland in 1905 and later in other countries 
 Warszawianka, Masovian Voivodeship, a village
 Warszawianka Warszawa, a Warsaw sports club, 1921–1971
 Project 636 Varshavyanka, an Improved Kilo class submarine